BigRock Mountain is located in Mars Hill, Maine, on the western face of Mars Hill. It is one of the larger ski resorts in the State of Maine with 2 chairlifts, 26 trails, 80% snowmaking, night skiing, and almost 1000 ft of continuous vertical drop.

Terrain
Most of the terrain at BigRock is intermediate ski trails, serviced by the North Star Double Chair, a modified Mueller chairlift. The mountain is also serviced by a poma. The beginner area is serviced by the South Star Triple Chair. Of the trails, 58% are intermediate, while 30% are advanced trails, and 18% beginner trails.

History
Established in the 1960s, BigRock Ski Area was purchased in 2000 by the Maine Winter Sports Center (MWSC) through grants available from the Portland-based Libra Foundation.

MWSC added cross-country and snowshoe trails, as well as a snow-tube park.  BigRock's lodge has been expanded to include a new cafe.

References

External links
Bigrock Ski Resort
Trail Map
Ski Maine Association
Bigrock Info Page
Maine Winter Sports Center

Ski areas and resorts in Maine
Tourist attractions in Aroostook County, Maine
Buildings and structures in Aroostook County, Maine